Zubilin may refer to:

 Elizabeth Zubilin, pseudonym of the Soviet spy Elizaveta Zarubina
 Vasily Zubilin, pseudonym of the Soviet spy Vasily Zarubin